The Kaiviti Silktails are a semi-professional rugby league football club from Fiji competing in the NSWRL's Ron Massey Cup, and will advance to the Knock-On Effect(KOE) NSW Cup in the future. The Silktails will be a predominantly Under-23 side from 2022 onwards.

History
The NSWRL had first endorsed a bid team from Fiji led by Petero Civoniceva early in 2014 to have a team compete in the 2016 NSW Cup competition. The bid received endorsement from the Fiji National Rugby League in 2018. In June 2019, it was announced that the Kaiviti Silktails would enter the Ron Massey Cup in 2020, with promotion to the New South Wales Cup in 2021. Brandon Costin, coach of the Fijian national team, was announced as head coach.

The Silktails won their opening match of the 2020 season 40–16 against the Windsor Wolves in Lautoka. The season was subsequently cancelled due to the COVID-19 pandemic. Wes Naiqama was named head coach in June 2020.

The Silktails remained in the Ron Massey Cup in 2021, remaining in Australia for the duration of the season due to the COVID-19 pandemic, and playing their home matches at Mascot Oval. During their round 1 bye, the team played a trial match against the Mascot Jets, winning 46–16. Their round 2 match against the Blacktown Workers Sea Eagles was postponed due to inclement weather.

Stadium

The Silktails were scheduled to play all 10 of their home matches in 2020 at Churchill Park, Lautoka. In 2021, the team played all of their home matches at Mascot Oval, Sydney.

Players

Current squad
Squad for season 2023.
1. Ratu Jilivecevece
2. Timoci Bola
3. Osea Natoga 
4. Filimoni Paul 
5. Paula Valisoliso
6. Mosese Qionimacawa 
7. Sunia Naruma
8. Apakuki Tavodi (c)
9. Penaia Leveleve
10. Meli Nasau 
11. Inoke Vasuturaga
12. Manasa Kalou
13. Ponipate Komai
14. Simone Cakauniqio
15. Samuela Yalisaya
16. Timoci Bola
17. Manoa Satala 
18. Watasoni Waqanisaravi
19. Manoa Vilikesa
20. Manueli Levaqai
21. Sirilo Lovokuro
22. Kilione Cagilevu 
23. Rusiate Baleitamavua
24. Jonathan Roseman
25. Iobe Taukeisalili
26. Viliame Tutuvili
27. Sitiveni Ravono
28. Mosese Qionimacawa.

See also
 Rugby league in Fiji
 Fiji national rugby league team

References

External links
Official website
Petero Civoniceva Foundation

Kaiviti Silktails
Rugby clubs established in 2019
2019 establishments in Fiji
Fijian rugby league teams
Diaspora sports clubs in Australia
Expansion of the National Rugby League